John Kennaway may refer to:

Sir John Kennaway, 1st Baronet (1758–1836), diplomat
Sir John Kennaway, 2nd Baronet (1797–1873), of the Kennaway Baronets
Sir John Kennaway, 3rd Baronet (1837–1919)
Sir John Kennaway, 4th Baronet (1879–1956), of the Kennaway Baronets
Sir John Lawrence Kennaway, 5th Baronet (b. 1933), of the Kennaway Baronets